Peter Dahl (born 14 February 1948) is a Danish former football forward who played for Akademisk Boldklub, Hvidovre IF, Rot-Weiss Essen, Lierse S.K. and Hannover 96. Dahl was head coach for BK Fremad Amager from January 1978 until August 1981.

References

External links
 
 

1948 births
Living people
Danish men's footballers
Danish expatriate men's footballers
Denmark international footballers
Danish expatriate sportspeople in Belgium
Danish expatriate sportspeople in Germany
Akademisk Boldklub players
Hvidovre IF players
Rot-Weiss Essen players
Lierse S.K. players
Hannover 96 players
Bundesliga players
2. Bundesliga players
Association football forwards
Fremad Amager managers
Danish football managers
Footballers from Copenhagen